Charles Chaplin (21 April 1786 – 24 May 1859) was an English Member of Parliament (MP).  He represented Stamford from 1809 to 1812 and Lincolnshire from 1818 to 1831.

References

External links 
 

1786 births
1859 deaths
Members of the Parliament of the United Kingdom for English constituencies
UK MPs 1807–1812
UK MPs 1818–1820
UK MPs 1820–1826
UK MPs 1826–1830
UK MPs 1830–1831